Nahr-e Hajji Mohammad (also Romanized as Nahr-e Ḩājjī Moḩammad; also known as Ḩājj Moḩammad, Ḩāj Moḩammad, and Nahr-e Ḩājj Moḩammad) is a village in Noabad Rural District, Arvandkenar District, Abadan County, Khuzestan Province, Iran. At the 2006 census, its population was 75, in 18 families.

References 

Populated places in Abadan County